The NRC Herzberg Astronomy and Astrophysics Research Centre (NRC Herzberg, HAA) is the leading Canadian centre for astronomy and astrophysics. It is based in Victoria, British Columbia. The current Director-General, as of 2021, is Luc Simard.

History 
Named for the Nobel laureate Gerhard Herzberg, it was formed in 1975 as part of the National Research Council of Canada in Ottawa, Ontario. The NRC-HIA headquarters were moved to Victoria, British Columbia in 1995 to the site of the Dominion Astrophysical Observatory. In 2012, the organization was restructured and renamed NRC Herzberg Astronomy and Astrophysics.

Facilities 
NRC-HAA also operates the Dominion Radio Astrophysical Observatory outside of Penticton, British Columbia and the Canadian Astronomy Data Centre as well as managing Canadian involvement in the Canada-France-Hawaii Telescope,  Gemini Observatory, Atacama Large Millimeter Array, the Square Kilometre Array, and the Thirty Meter Telescope, as well as Canada's national astronomy data centre.

 The institute is also involved in the development and construction of instruments and telescopes.
 Members of NRC-HAA are currently involved in The Next Generation Virgo Cluster Survey.
 Members of NRC-HAA are currently involved with Pan-Andromeda Archaeological Survey.

Plaskett Fellowship 
The Plaskett Fellowship is named after John Stanley Plaskett and is awarded to an outstanding, recent doctoral graduate in astrophysics or a closely related discipline. Fellows conduct independent research in a stimulating, collegial environment at the  Dominion Astrophysical Observatory in Victoria, British Columbia, Canada. Expertise in observational astrophysics is the norm, but some theoreticians were also among this distinguished group of astronomers.

Covington Fellowship 
The Covington Fellowship is named after Arthur Covington and is awarded to an outstanding, recent doctoral graduate in astrophysics or a closely related discipline. Fellows conduct independent research in a stimulating, collegial environment at the institute at the Dominion Radio Astrophysical Observatory in Penticton, BC. DRAO staff expertise is in observational radio astronomy and the development of instrumentation and technology for radio telescopes. Current and past Covington Fellows are:

See also 
 Atacama Large Millimeter Array
 Canada–France–Hawaii Telescope
 Dominion Radio Astrophysical Observatory
 Gemini Observatory
 James Clerk Maxwell Telescope
 Square Kilometre Array
 Thirty Meter Telescope
 James Webb Space Telescope

References

External links 
National science infrastructure (NRC Herzberg)
Herzberg Astrophysics Researchers

National Research Council (Canada)
Research institutes in Canada
Astronomy institutes and departments
Astrophysics institutes
1975 establishments in Ontario
Organizations based in Victoria, British Columbia